Granity Studios is a multimedia original content company formed by former NBA player Kobe Bryant, focused on creating new ways to tell stories around sports. The company is headquartered in Newport Beach, California.

History 
Granity Studios was launched by Kobe Bryant in 2013 as a company that developed different media, ranging from films, to television shows, to novels.

In 2017, Granity Studios produced Dear Basketball, an animated short film based on Kobe Bryant's retirement poem in The Players' Tribune, and was directed and animated by Glen Keane, with music by John Williams. At the 90th Academy Awards, Keane and Bryant won the Academy Award for Best Animated Short Film for their work on Dear Basketball. Bryant became the first African-American to win the category and the first former professional athlete to be nominated and to win an Academy Award in any category. The film also won the Annie Award for Best Animated Short Subject and a Sports Emmy Award. This was also the first Oscar win for Keane, a veteran Disney animator.

In addition to future animation projects, Bryant had been in talks with animator veterans Bruce W. Smith and Sergio Pablos for the last six months before his death about starting his own animation studio.

Beginning in 2018, Bryant wrote, produced and hosted the television series Detail, which aired for multiple seasons on ESPN and ESPN+. It featured his insights into the game of basketball and in-depth analyses of games and individual players.

On October 23, 2018, Bryant's book The Mamba Mentality: How I Play, with photographs and afterword by Andrew D. Bernstein, an introduction by Phil Jackson, and a foreword by Pau Gasol, was published by MCD / Farrar, Straus and Giroux. The book looks back on his career with photos and his reflections.

At the time of his death in 2020, Bryant was working with Brazilian author Paulo Coelho on a children's book aimed at inspiring underprivileged children. After Bryant's death, Coelho deleted the draft, saying in an interview that "it didn't make any sense to publish without him." He did not say how many pages had been written or whether the book had a title.

Bryant also co-wrote/produced several young adult novels through Granity Studios: The Wizenard Series: Training Camp, Legacy and the Queen, and Epoca: The Tree of Ecrof. A fourth novel, The Wizenard Series: Season One, was released posthumously in March 2020. The Wizarenard Series: Season One topped the New York Times middle-grade hardcover list.

Vanessa Bryant is the president and chief executive officer of Granity Studios.

Films

Television

Books

Podcasts

References

External links

Entertainment companies based in California
2013 establishments in California
Companies based in Newport Beach, California
Kobe Bryant